Siccia atriguttata is a moth in the family Erebidae. It was described by George Hampson in 1909. It is found in Angola and South Africa.

References

Moths described in 1909
Nudariina